Kenwood High School is a high school located in Clarksville, Tennessee. It is part of the Clarksville-Montgomery County School System.  It is home to the city's largest sports park, and the stadium is the largest high school/middle school stadium. Within this park are 7 soccer fields. These fields are used by many of the high and middle schools in the county for practice and elementary school games.

STEM Academy 

Introduced to Kenwood High School in fall 2010, the STEM Academy is open by application for students who have an aptitude for math and science that have already been demonstrated to some degree in their academic career. These students like to solve problems, improve ideas, and think semi-logically. Additionally, the STEM Academy student will have a sincere interest in a STEM-oriented career field, specifically in engineering, and will work well learning through hands-on activities. Students will be selected utilizing multiple criteria, including test scores, grades, career interests, and attendance.

The STEM Academy has currently partnered with Austin Peay State University to identify scholarship opportunities for STEM academy students as well as offer special consideration if they apply to the TN Governor's School of Computational Physics (upon completion of the school, students can earn college credit hours there as well). APSU has also specially designed a summer enrichment program, SOARing with Mathematics for the STEM Academy students entering the 10th grade; as well as a Summer Science And Math Academy (SAMA) for STEM Academy students entering either 10th or 11th grade.

Extracurricular activities 

Kenwood High School has many extracurricular activities, including:

Athletics 
 Baseball
 Basketball
 Cheerleading
 Cross Country
 Football
 Golf
 Marching Band
 Soccer
 Softball
 Tennis
 Track & Field
 Volleyball
 Wrestling
 Lia Hunting

Clubs & Programs 
 4-H
 Anime & Gamers Club
 Art Club
 Band
 Criminal Justice Chapter
 Dance Team
 Drama Club
 FCCLA
 Fellowship of Christian Athletes
 Forensics Team
 Future Business Leaders of America
 German Club
 Guitar Club
 Hispanic Organization for Progress & Education (HOPE)
 Health Occupations Students of America
 HVAC Chapter
 JROTC
 Junior Civitan
 Key Club
 KNN (Kenwood News Now)
 Newspaper
 National Honor Society
 Photography Club
 Reel Knights
 Student Government Association (SGA)
 Skills USA
 Student-2-Student
 Yearbook
 Zombie Survivalists
 Oobi Club

References

External links
Official site
Athletics
Clubs
Frontpage

Public high schools in Tennessee
Schools in Montgomery County, Tennessee
Education in Clarksville, Tennessee